Kampai I (Kampai 1st, formerly) is a village in Kėdainiai district municipality, in Kaunas County, in central Lithuania. According to the 2011 census, the village had a population of 9 people. The road 229 Aristava-Kėdainiai-Cinkiškiai goes through the western limit of the village.

History 
At the beginning of the 20th there were four okolicas of Kampai. From two of them - Kampai Klementai and Kampai Motiejūnai - Kampai I village has been created at 1950s.

Demography

Images

References

Villages in Kaunas County
Kėdainiai District Municipality